Children's Souls Accuse You (German: Kinderseelen klagen euch an) is a 1927 German silent drama film directed by Curtis Bernhardt and starring Albert Steinrück, Nathalie Lissenko and Walter Rilla. It was made with an anti-abortion theme. It was shot at the Terra Studios in Berlin. The film's sets were designed by the art director Heinrich Richter.

Cast
 Albert Steinrück as Kommerzienrat Enzenberg  
 Nathalie Lissenko as Luise Enzenberg  
 Walter Rilla 
 Claire Rommer as Annemarie Trebisch  
 Fritz Rasp as Heinrich Voss – Enzenbergs Sekretär  
 Harry Hardt as Buchhalter Banthler 
 Carla Bartheel as Hilda – Heinrichs Schwester  
 Bruno Ziener as Josef – Diener  
 Evi Moog as Die kleine Helmuth

References

Bibliography
 Bock, Hans-Michael & Bergfelder, Tim. The Concise Cinegraph: Encyclopaedia of German Cinema. Berghahn Books, 2009.

External links

1927 films
Films of the Weimar Republic
German silent feature films
Films directed by Curtis Bernhardt
1927 drama films
German drama films
Films about abortion
German black-and-white films
Silent drama films
1920s German films
Films shot at Terra Studios
1920s German-language films